The 2000 UCI Road World Championships took place in Plouay, France, between October 9 and October 15, 2000. The event consisted of a road race and a time trial for men, women, men under 23, junior men and junior women.

Events summary

Medals table

External links 
Results and report of cyclingnews.com

 
UCI Road World Championships by year
World Championships
Uci Road World Championships, 2000
UCI Road World Championships
International cycle races hosted by France